Vasilios Antoniadis (born 4 February 1960) is a Greek football manager.

References

1960 births
Living people
Greek football managers
Iraklis Thessaloniki F.C. managers
Apollon Pontou FC managers
Niki Volos F.C. managers
Pierikos F.C. managers
Naoussa F.C. managers
Trikala F.C. managers
Panetolikos F.C. managers
A.O. Kerkyra managers
Kalamata F.C. managers
Agrotikos Asteras F.C. managers
Panserraikos F.C. managers
Kastoria F.C. managers
Olympiacos Volos F.C. managers
Thrasyvoulos F.C. managers
Sportspeople from Kilkis